Grete Kuld (née Klein; born 12 February 1989) is an Estonian singer, actress, and television presenter.

Early life
Kuld was born on 12 February 1989 in Tallinn, Estonia.

Career
Kuld ecame known as a weather forecaster for the Kanal 2 news program Reporter. In 2012, she participated in the TV show Tähed jääl (Stars on Ice). From 2014 to 2022, she portrayed Laura (Laura Pille Lind), one of the four main characters in Padjaklubi (Pillow Club). In 2021, Kuld was awarded the title "Sexiest Woman of the Year". Together with Tõnis Niinemets, she was the presenter of Eesti Laul 2021 and Eesti Laul 2023.

As a singer, Kuld has released two solo albums and was in the band Sunberryz in 2012.

Personal life
On 13 March 2019, Kuld gave birth to a daughter named Saara. On 26 June 2020, she married her partner Ergo Kuld.

Discography
Studio albums
Armastusega (2010)
Liebe (2017)

Singles
Kruiisime (2012, with Sunberryz)
Vari (2014)
Ma valin Sind ft. Margus Vaher (2015)

Filmography

Film

Television

References

External links
 

1989 births
Living people
Actresses from Tallinn
Singers from Tallinn
Estonian television presenters
Estonian film actresses
Estonian television actresses
Estonian pop singers
21st-century Estonian actresses
21st-century Estonian women singers